Viscount  was an admiral in the Imperial Japanese Navy.

Biography
Morio Matsudaira was the son of Matsudaira Katamori, the former daimyō of Aizu-Wakamatsu domain in what is now Fukushima prefecture. He was born at the Matsudaira's Tokyo residence in 1878.

Matsudaira graduated from the 28th class of the Imperial Japanese Naval Academy in 1900. He was ranked 86th in a class of 105 cadets. Matsudaira was promoted to lieutenant commander in 1910, which was also the same year that he succeeded to the head of the Aizu Matsudaira household. He inherited his brother's title of viscount (shishaku) under the kazoku peerage system.

In 1914, he was appointed chief gunnery officer on the battleship , and served from 1915-1916 as executive officer on the cruiser . Matsudaira was promoted to commander in 1916, and was assigned as aide-de-camp to Prince Fushimi Hiroyasu from December 1916-November 1918. On 10 November 1918, he was reassigned as executive officer on the battleship . Promoted to captain in 1920, he received his first command on 10 November 1922: the battlecruiser . From 1923 onwards, he served in a number of staff positions. On 1 December 1925, he was promoted to rear admiral and entered the reserves two weeks later.

Matsudaira Morio's son-in-law was a grandson of Tokugawa Yoshinobu, named Hikaru Tokugawa.  He was a naval officer and killed in World War II. Morio's niece, Setsuko, married Prince Chichibu.

References

Books
Miyazaki Tomihachi 宮崎十三八, "Matsudaira Katamori no shutsuji to sono ichizoku" 松平容保の出自とその一族, in Matsudaira Katamori no Subete 松平容保のすべて, ed. Tsunabuchi Kenjō 綱淵謙錠 (Tokyo: Shin Jinbutsu Ōraisha, 1984), p. 74.

External links

Notes

1878 births
1944 deaths
Kazoku
Imperial Japanese Navy admirals
People from Tokyo
Japanese military personnel of World War II
Aizu-Matsudaira clan